Cincinnati/Northern Kentucky International Airport  is a public international airport located in Hebron, Kentucky, United States. It serves the Cincinnati tri-state area. The airport's code, CVG, is derived  from the nearest city at the time of its opening, Covington, Kentucky.

Currently, Cincinnati/Northern Kentucky International Airport offers non-stop passenger service to over 50 destinations in North America and Europe. The airport is a global hub for Amazon Air, Atlas Air, ABX Air, Kalitta Air, and DHL Aviation, handling numerous domestic and international cargo flights every day. CVG is currently the 7th busiest airport in the United States by cargo traffic, and is additionally the fastest-growing cargo airport in North America.

History

Beginnings
President Franklin D. Roosevelt approved preliminary funds for site development of the Greater Cincinnati Airport on February 11, 1942. This was part of the United States Army Air Corps program to establish training facilities during World War II. At the time, air traffic in the area centered on Lunken Airport just southeast of central Cincinnati. Lunken opened in 1926 in the Ohio River Valley; it frequently experienced fog, and the 1937 flood submerged its runways and two-story terminal building. Federal officials wanted an airfield site that would not be prone to flooding, but Cincinnati officials hoped to build Lunken into the region's main airport.

Officials from Boone, Kenton, and Campbell counties in Kentucky took advantage of Cincinnati's short-sightedness and lobbied Congress to build an airfield there. Boone County officials offered a suitable site on the provision that Kenton County paid the acquisition cost. In October 1942, Congress provided $2 million to build four runways.

The field opened August 12, 1944, with the first B-17 bombers beginning practice runs on August 15. As the tide of the war had already turned, the Air Corps only used the field until it was declared surplus in 1945. However, this was not before the first regularly scheduled air freight shipment in the United States arrived in mid-September, signalling the future importance of the airport.

On October 27, 1946, a small wooden terminal building opened and the airport prepared for commercial service under the name Greater Cincinnati Airport. Boone County Airlines was the first airline to provide scheduled service from the airport and had its headquarters at the airport.

The first commercial flight, an American Airlines DC-3 from Cleveland, landed on January 10, 1947, at 9:53 am. A Delta Air Lines flight followed moments later. The April 1957 Official Airline Guide shows 97 weekday departures: 37 American, 26 Delta, 24 TWA, 8 Piedmont, and 2 Lake Central. As late as November 1959 the airport had four  runways at 45-degree angles, the north–south runway eventually being extended into today's runway 18C/36C.

In the 1950s Cincinnati city leaders began pushing for expansion of a site in Blue Ash to both compete with the Greater Cincinnati Airport and replace Lunken as the city's primary airport. The city purchased Hugh Watson Field in 1955, turning it into Blue Ash Airport. The city's Blue Ash plans were hampered by community opposition, three failed Hamilton County bond measures, political infighting, and Cincinnati's decision not to participate in the federal airfield program.

Jet age
On December 16, 1960, the jet age arrived in Cincinnati when a Delta Air Lines Convair 880 from Miami completed the first scheduled jet flight. The airport needed to expand and build more modern terminals and other facilities; the original Terminal A was expanded and renovated. A new east–west runway crossing the longer north–south runway was constructed in 1971 south of the older east–west runway.

In 1977, before the Airline Deregulation Act was passed, CVG, like many small airports, anticipated the loss of numerous flights; creating the opportunity for Patrick Sowers, Robert Tranter, and David and Raymound Mueller to establish Comair to fill the void. The airline began service to Akron/Canton, Cleveland, and Evansville. In 1981, Comair became a public company, added 30-seat turboprops to its fleet, and began to rapidly expand its destinations. In 1984, Comair became a Delta Connection carrier with Delta's establishment of a hub at CVG. That same year, Comair introduced its first international flights from Cincinnati to Toronto. In 1992, Comair moved into Concourse C, as Delta Air Lines gradually continued to acquire more of the airlines stock. In 1993, Comair was the launch customer for the Canadair Regional Jet, of which it would later operate the largest fleet in the world. By 1999, Comair was the largest regional airline in the country worth over $2 billion, transporting 6 million passengers yearly to 83 destinations on 101 aircraft. Later that year, Delta Air Lines acquired the remaining portion of Comair's stock, causing Comair to solely operate Delta Connection flights.

In 1988, two founders of Comair, Patrick Sowers and Robert Tranter launched a new scheduled airline from CVG named Enterprise Airlines, which served 16 cities at its peak. The airline spearheaded the regional jet revolution in a unique manner by operating 10-seat Cessna Citation business jets in scheduled services. The flights became popular with Cincinnati companies. The airline served destinations including Baltimore, Boston, Cedar Rapids, Columbus (OH), Green Bay, Greensboro, Greenville, Hartford, Memphis, Milwaukee, New York–JFK, and Wilmington (NC). The airline also became the first international feed carrier by feeding the British Airways Concorde at JFK. In 1991, the airline ceased operations because of high fuel prices and the suspension of the British Airways contract after the first Gulf War.

Delta hub

In the mid-1980s, Delta opened a hub in Cincinnati and constructed Terminal C and D with 22 gates. Delta followed this up in 1992 by spending $550 million constructing Terminal 3 with Concourses A and B and C. During the decade, Delta ramped up both mainline and Comair operations and established Delta Connection. This dramatically increased the aircraft operations from around 300,000 to 500,000 yearly aircraft movements. In turn, passenger volumes doubled within a decade from 10 million to over 20 million. This expansion prompted the building of runway 18L/36R and the airport began making preparations to construct Concourse D while adding an expansion to Concourse A and B.

At its peak, CVG became Delta's second largest hub, handling over 600 flights daily in 2005. It was the fourth largest hub in the world for a single airline, based on departures, ranking only behind Atlanta, Chicago–O'Hare, and Dallas/Fort Worth. The hub served everything from a 64-mile flight to Dayton, to a daily nonstop to Honolulu and Anchorage, to transatlantic destinations including Amsterdam, Brussels, Frankfurt, London, Manchester, Munich, Paris, Rome, and Zürich. Additionally, Air France operated flights into CVG for several periods for over a decade before finally terminating the service in 2007.

When Delta went into bankruptcy in September 2005, a large reduction at CVG eliminated most early-morning and night flights. These initial cuts caused additional routes to become unprofitable, causing the frequency of low-volume routes to be further cut from 2006 to 2007. Planning for the new east–west runway stopped, along with all expansions to current terminals; Terminal 1 was closed due to lack of service. In 2008, Delta merged with Northwest Airlines and cut flight capacity from the Cincinnati hub by 22 percent with an additional 17 percent reduction in 2009. Concourse C, opened in 1994 at a cost of $50 million, was permanently closed in 2008 and demolished in 2016. Further reductions in early 2010 caused Delta to close Concourse A in Terminal 3 on May 1, consolidating all operations into Concourse B. This resulted in the layoff of more than 800 employees.

By 2011, Delta was down to roughly 130 flights per day at CVG. After several years of cuts to its older fleet, which were cited as being cut due to high costs associated with rising oil prices, Delta's wholly-owned and CVG-based subsidiary, Comair, ceased all operations in September 2012, ending over three decades of operations. In 2017, the hub was downgraded to a focus city. In 2020, due to the COVID-19 pandemic, Delta closed its pilot and flight attendant bases and dropped CVG as a focus city, marking the end of the Delta hub era.

Recent history

Until 2015, CVG consistently ranked among the most expensive major airports in the United States. Delta operated over 75% of flights at CVG, a fact often cited as a reason for relatively high domestic ticket prices. Airline officials suggested that Delta was practicing predatory pricing to drive away discount airlines. From 1990 to 2003, ten discount airlines began service at CVG, but later pulled out, including Vanguard Airlines, which pulled out of CVG twice. After Delta downsized its hub operations, low cost carriers began operations and have been sustained at the airport ever since.

Terminal 2 was closed in May 2012, and CVG re-opened and consolidated all non-Delta airlines to Concourse A in Terminal 3 at that time, which became the sole terminal. Renovation and expansion of the ticketing/check-in area and Concourse A took place that year to accommodate the move. Terminals 1 and 2 were torn down in early 2017 to construct an overnight parking and deicing area. Both concourses, the customs facility, baggage claim, and ticketing areas were renovated in late 2017 to mid 2018 under a $4.5 million plan. In 2021, the airport opened a new rental car and ground transportation center adjacent to the main terminal.

Facilities

Terminal
The airport has one terminal and two concourses with a total of 50 gates. Both concourses are islands and are only accessible by an underground moving walkway or people mover. All international arrivals without pre-clearance are handled in Concourse B.

Concourse A has 22 gates.
Concourse B has 28 gates.

Art

The airport is home to 14 large Art Deco murals created for the train concourse building at Cincinnati Union Terminal during the station's construction in 1932. Mosaic murals depicting people at work in local Cincinnati workplaces were incorporated into the interior design of the railroad station by Winold Reiss, a German-born artist with a reputation in interior design. When the train concourse building was designated for demolition in 1972, a "Save the Terminal Committee" raised funds to remove and transport the 14 murals in the concourse to new locations in the Airport. They were placed in Terminal 1, as well as Terminals 2 and 3, which were then being constructed as part of major airport expansion and renovation. When Terminals 1 and 2 were demolished, the murals in those areas were stored and the new Security Screening building was designed to accommodate the heavy weight of the murals with the eastern "store front" windows designed to be removable to permit the future installation of the murals. The murals were also featured in a scene in the film Rain Man starring Dustin Hoffman and Tom Cruise. In addition, a walkway to one of the terminals at CVG was featured in the scene in the film when Hoffman's character, Raymond, refused to fly on a plane. The nine murals located in the former Terminals 1 & 2 was relocated to the Duke Energy Convention Center in downtown Cincinnati.

Additionally, there are several pieces of Charley Harper artwork in the Concourse B food court.

Cargo hubs

In 1984, DHL opened its CVG hub and began operations throughout the U.S. and world. However, in 2004, DHL decided to move its hub to Wilmington, Ohio, in order to compete in the United States shipment business. The plan ended up failing, and moved back to CVG in 2009 to resume its original operations. CVG now serves as the largest of DHL's three global hubs (The other two being Leipzig/Halle and Hong Kong) with 84 flights each day to destinations across North America, Europe, Middle East, Asia, and the Pacific. DHL has completed a $105-million expansion and employs approximately 2,500 at CVG. Because of this growth, CVG now stands as the 4th busiest airport in North America based on cargo tonnage and 34th in the world.

On May 28, 2015, DHL announced a $108-million expansion to its current facility, which doubled the current cargo operations. The money was used to double the gate capacity for transferring cargo, an expansion to the sorting facility, and various technical improvements, which was completed in Autumn 2016. In addition, this has provided many more jobs for the Cincinnati area, and will dramatically increase the airport's operations.

On January 31, 2017, Amazon announced that its new cargo airline, Amazon Air would pick CVG as its main worldwide shipping hub, following an investment of $1.49 billion dollars in the construction and expansion of a cargo facility on the airport grounds. The company used DHL's facilities prior to the construction of its new facility. The hub is Amazon's principal shipping hub and was constructed on 1,129 acres of land at the airport with a 3 million square-ft sorting facility and parking positions for over 100 aircraft. On April 30, 2017, Amazon began operations at CVG with 75 Boeing 767-200ER's/300ER's aircraft based at the airport and planned to have 200 daily takeoffs and landings from its CVG hub to destinations across the U.S. and internationally. The hub could create up to 15,000 jobs in the Cincinnati/Northern Kentucky region. On August 11, 2021, Amazon debuted its new cargo hub at CVG.

Airlines and destinations

Passenger

Cargo

Statistics

Top destinations

Airline market share

Annual traffic

Accidents and incidents

 On January 12, 1955, 1955 Cincinnati mid-air collision, a Martin 2-0-2 was in the take off phase of departure from the airport when it collided with a privately owned Castleton Farm DC-3. The mid-air collision killed 13 people on the commercial airliner and 2 on the privately owned plane.
 On November 14, 1961, Zantop cargo flight, a DC-4, crashed near runway 18 into an apple orchard. The crew survived.
 On November 8, 1965, American Airlines Flight 383, a Boeing 727, crashed on approach to runway 18C, killing 58 (53 passengers and 5 crew) of the 62 (56 passengers and 6 crew) on board.
 On November 6, 1967, TWA Flight 159, a Boeing 707, overran the runway during an aborted takeoff, injuring 11 of the 29 passengers. One of the injured passengers died four days later. The seven crew members were unhurt.
 On November 20, 1967, TWA Flight 128, a Convair 880, crashed on approach to runway 18, killing 70 (65 passengers and 5 crew) of the 82 persons aboard (75 passengers and 7 crew).
 On October 8, 1979, Comair Flight 444, a Piper Navajo, crashed shortly after takeoff. Seven passengers and the pilot were killed.
 On October 19, 1979, Burlington Airways, a Beechcraft Model 18 crash landed on KY 237 at the I-275 bridge overpass. There were no injures.
 On June 2, 1983, Air Canada Flight 797, a DC-9 flying on the Dallas-Toronto-Montreal route, made an emergency landing at Cincinnati due to a cabin fire. 23 of the 41 passengers died of smoke inhalation or fire burns, including legendary Canadian folk singer Stan Rogers. All five crew members survived.
 On August 13, 2004, Air Tahoma Flight 185, a Convair 580, was en route to Cincinnati from Memphis, Tennessee, carrying freight under contract for DHL Worldwide Express. The aircraft crashed on a golf course just south of the Cincinnati airport due to fuel starvation and dual engine failure, killing the first officer and injuring the captain.
 On October 20, 2018, Polar Air Cargo Flight 243, a Boeing 747-400, arriving from Anchorage veered right off runway 27 upon landing and came to a stop on soft ground between taxiways K6 and K7. There were no injuries and the aircraft did not sustain any damage.
 On January 13, 2019, Delta Air Lines Flight 1708, a Boeing 737-900ER, which had arrived from Las Vegas was taxiing to its gate located at Concourse B when at around 5:30AM slid off the taxiway and into the grass due to poor weather conditions. None of the 126 passengers or crew on board were seriously injured. Everyone on board was later taken to the Concourse via bus.

See also

 Ohio World War II Army Airfields
 Kentucky World War II Army Airfields
 Cincinnati Municipal Lunken Airport
 Cincinnati–Blue Ash Airport
 Cincinnati West Airport

References

Footnotes

Notes

External links
 
 Historical Images of Cincinnati-Northern Kentucky Airport
 History of the Industrial Murals
 Mural images and location map
 
 

 
Airports in Kentucky
Cincinnati metropolitan area
Airports established in 1944
Transportation in Boone County, Kentucky
Airfields of the United States Army Air Forces in Kentucky
Airfields of the United States Army Air Forces Technical Service Command
1944 establishments in Kentucky
Transportation in Cincinnati